is a Japanese light novel series written by Mikage Kasuga and illustrated by Tomari Meron. Seven volumes and one prequel volume have been published by Shueisha since August 2015 under their Dash X Bunko imprint. A manga adaptation with art by Yagi Shinba and Hirafumi titled  was serialized in Shueisha's Dash X Comic website from February to November 2018. An anime television series adaptation by AXsiZ aired from October to December 2018.

Plot
Montmorency is a young knight whose dreams is to become an alchemist and find out the secret of the Philosopher’s Stone.

When the English army occupy northern France during the Hundred Years War, most of the young students of the Knights School are sent in battle, and the same occurs for Montmorency's secret love, who is apparently killed during the Battle of Azincourt; after this, everyone's routes take different ways, at the point of finding themselves as enemies when some of their households choose to betray France for England. In search of a way to stop every war, Montmorency performs a secret alchemic ritual that allows him to evoke the Queen of the Fairies Astaroth, which promises to teach him how to use the stone to become a Ulysses, an immortal alchemist with infinite power.

In the following seven years, Montmorency keeps on learning from Astaroth how to become a Ulysses while traveling along France, but due to unexpected events, he ends up performing the ritual on a young dying girl named Jeanne, who becomes the Ulysses in his place. In this way, Jeanne will gain the power to turn the tides of the war and be known from now on as Jeanne d'Arc.

Characters

A young alchemist in search of a way to unveil the secret behind the Philosopher's Stone and become a Ulysses, a supreme being with the power to create a worldwide utopia. He met Jeanne and used half of the stone to save her life, he has sworn to protect her and make sure that her fate of holy savior of France is fulfilled. Once forced to swallow the other half of the stone to save Jeanne, he too has become an Ulysses, gaining the power to turn wind and air into an unbreakable shield.

A twelve-year-old young girl from Domremy with a kind and gentle personality. After having been mortally wounded by the English when Domremy is attacked, Montmorency has put half of his Philosopher's Stone in her body to save her life, making her the new Ulysses. Due to her young age and having only half of the stone in her body, Jeanne can become an Ulysses just for three minutes; in this form, she turns into a powerful and almost invincible fighter, but at the same time she becomes extremely brutal and sadistic, since the stone's power amplifies her arrogance.

The immortal Queen of the Fairies and the guardian of the Philosopher's Stone, called in the human world by Montmorency to help him become a Ulysses. She loves to provoke Montmorency and scold him for his lack of experience. As long as the Philosopher Stone exists, as its guardian, she cannot die.

Montmorency's cousin, he's the Grand Chamberlain of France. Despite his being Charlotte's first councellor, he thinks that the Valois has no chance to win against the English; for this, he conspires with the English and the Burgundy household to end the war with a treaty that will surrender half of France to the enemy, leaving however the still free lands under Charlotte's control. Once found out and forced to escape, he sides with the Inquisition to destroy Jeanne. He's also a sadistic and sinister collector of fairies.

One of Montmorency's childhood friends, and the young boy's secret love since when they studied at the Knights Academy. When the French army is wiped away in the battle of Azincourt, her broken sword has been found on the battlefield by Montmorency, pursuing the boy to think her dead. However it's later revealed that she's been captured by the English. She belongs to the Brittany household.

The heir of the Burgundy household, she's one of Montmorency's childhood friends. After the Battle of Azincourt her family has chosen to betray the Valois and side with the English. It's revealed later that she is a Ulysses known as "Dark Ulysses" through the use of Montmorency's elixir and a cursed helmet, the Saint Grail. Apart from turning into a young woman, as a Dark Ulysses she becomes as brutal and powerful as Jeanne, but differently from her she takes pleasure in killing her enemies; plus this, the Saint Grail's healing powers protect her from almost every mortal wound she suffers.

Third daughter of the French Royal Family of the Valois, she's the third member of Montmorency's old group of friends. After her brothers' death in the Battle of Azincourt, she's become the next heir to the throne.

The commander of a mercenary unit sent by Charlotte to protect Domremy and the rest of Lorraine. She wields a massive lance and a pistol. She loves cute things and because of this, she becomes infatuated with Jeanne and Astaroth the moment she saw them. During the Siege of Orléans she stabs herself with the holy sword Joyeuse to fight the demon Enlil, turning into an Ulysses and gaining the Ultimate Eye, a special power that implements her aiming abilities to their maximum.

The commander the French army during the Siege of Orléans, he's Richemont's younger brother and the ruler of Alençon. He's one of the few nobles of Northern France still loyal to the Valois.

Charlotte's illegitimate cousin and her trustworthy bodyguard, he's Alençon's second-in-command during the Siege of Orléans. Despite his being a boy, he dresses and acts as a girl by Charlotte's order, to satisfy the princess' desire of having a little sister.

Second-in-Command of La Hire's mercenary unit, he fights by wielding a massive broadsword. He's in love with his Commander, continuously trying to receive a kiss from her.

Media

Light novel

Manga
A manga drawn by Yagi Shinba and Hirafumi. Story is a bit different from the novel and the anime.

Anime
An anime television series adaptation by AXsiZ aired from October 7 to December 30, 2018, on Tokyo MX and other channels. The series is directed by Shin Itagaki, with Ryunosuke Kingetsu handled the series composition, Jouji Sawada designed the characters, and Taku Iwasaki composed the music. The series was simulcast by Crunchyroll, with Funimation producing an English dub as it aired. Following Sony's acquisition of Crunchyroll, the dub was moved to Crunchyroll. The series ran for 12 episodes. On November 27, 2018, due to unrevealed reasons, AXsiZ announced that episode 9 of the show was delayed for a week.

References

External links
  
 

2015 Japanese novels
2018 anime television series debuts
Anime and manga based on light novels
AXsiZ
Crunchyroll anime
Cultural depictions of Joan of Arc
Cultural depictions of Napoleon
Dash X Bunko
Europe in fiction
European Union in fiction
France in fiction
Historical fantasy anime and manga
Hundred Years' War in fiction
Light novels
Seinen manga
Shueisha books
Shueisha manga
Television shows set in Europe
Television shows set in France
Tokyo MX original programming
Works based on Arthurian legend